Marco Mincoff (1909-1987) Shakespearean scholar and professor of English Studies at the University of Sofia.

Mincoff was born July 15 (28), 1909 in Chamkorya (now Samokov, Bulgaria). With a Humboldt grant he completed his doctoral dissertation at the University of Berlin in 1933. From 1951 to 1974 he was head of the department of English at the University of Sofia. Over the years, teaching courses in grammar, phonetics, stylistics and the history of English literature, he wrote various textbooks and monographs. However his main subject was English Renaissance drama, on which he wrote numerous articles. His work earned him recognition and he became a member of the editorial boards of Shakespeare Survey, Shakespeare Quarterly, Shakespeare Studies, and a few other learned journals. In 1966 the Shakespeare Institute at the University of Birmingham awarded him an honorary title. A commemorative volume containing some biographical material and facsimile reproductions of twenty five of his papers appeared in 2009 on the occasion of the hundredth year of his birth.

Works
Christopher Marlowe: a study of his development (Sofia, 1937)
Shakespeare: life & works (in Bulgarian) (1946; 2nd. ed. Sofia: Rollis Press, 1992)
Baroque Literature in England, (1947) repr. in Limon J., and Halio J., Shakespeare and his contemporaries, Associated University Presses, 1993, p. 11-69
An English Grammar (Sofia: Nauka i Izkustvo, 1950)
English Historical Grammar (Sofia, 1955)
An Introduction to English Phonetics (1960; 3rd. ed. Sofia: Nauka i Izkustvo, 1973)
A Study of Style (1965; 2nd. ed. Sofia: Pleiada, 1998)
A History of English Literature Parts I and II (1970; 3rd. ed. Sofia: Nauka i Izkustvo, 1998)
Shakespeare: the first steps (Sofia: Bulgarian Academy of Sciences, 1976)
Things Supernatural and Causeless (1987; 2nd. ed. London & Toronto: Associated University Presses, 1992) 
Studies in English Renaissance Drama (Sofia University Press, 2009)

References

1909 births
1987 deaths
Shakespearean scholars
Sofia University